Igor Meglinski is a British, Finnish, New Zealand physicist, scientist, and biomedical engineer best known for his development of fundamental studies and translation research dedicated to imaging of cells and biological tissues utilising polarised light, dynamic light scattering and computational imitation of light propagation within complex tissue-like scattering medium.

Education and career 
Igor Meglinski is a Full Professor of Biomedical Engineering and Biophotnics at Aston University (Birmingham, UK) and holds the Professor of Opto-Electronics and Biophotonics at Oulu University (Oulu, Finland). He obtained his BSc/MSc in Laser Physics from the Saratov State University, and PhD degree in 1997, studying at the interface between Saratov State University (Russia) and the University of Pennsylvania (United States) under the supervision of Professor Britton Chance, Professor Arjun Yodh and Professor Valery V. Tuchin . After a few years of postdoctoral research in the School of Physics at the University of Exeter, he became a Lecturer and Director of Biomedical Optical Diagnostics Laboratory in the School of Engineering at Cranfield University in 2001, and a Head of Bio-Photonics & Bio-Medical Optical Diagnostics in the School of Health of Cranfield University in 2007. Being a part of Cranfield Business Incubator Centre, funded by East of England Development Agency (EEDA), he created a laboratory/hub to address the needs of industrial partners. The Biophotonics group headed by Professor Meglinski became one of the UK’s top five research groups in terms of percentage of its income earned from basic research and through the close collaboration with the blue chip industrial partners, including direct funding from Procter & Gamble, Philips, GE HealthCare, and other.
In 2009 he has been invited to develop Biophotonics research in the University of Otago (New Zealand), becoming a Head of Bio-Photonics & Bio-Medical Imaging in the Department of Physics. Being a part of Dodd-Walls Centre of Research Excellence in Photonic and Quantum Technologies and the Centre for Translational Cancer Research  he has been awarded to lead the project "Biomedical imaging and cancer detection using light and ultrasound" within the Ministry of Business, Innovation and Employment’s 2012 Science Investment Round. 
In 2014 Prof. Meglinski back to Europe, heading the Opto-Electronic and Measurement Techniques Department at the Faculty of Information Technology and Electrical Engineering (ITEE) in the University of Oulu in Finland. Since 2019 he is Professor in Biomedical Engineering and Biophotonics in Aston University, working at the interface between School of Engineering & Applied Science and School of Life & Health Sciences. He is actively involved in various international activities and events organised by the IEEE Photonics Society - IEEE UK and Ireland Photonics Chapter ,, SPIE , OPTICA , and other ,,.
He is board member of the Engineering & Physical Sciences Section  of The Royal Microscopical Society, and the member of editorial boards of the Optical Society's Biomedical Optics Express journal , Sustainable Materials and Technologies , Journal of Biomedical Photonics & Engineering .

Research
Prof. Meglinski explored the use of coherent properties of multiply scattered light, e.g. such as universal decay of temporal correlation function and enhancement of coherent back-scattering light. He pioneered the application of Diffusing Wave Spectroscopy (DWS) for non-invasive monitoring of blood flow and superficial blood microcirculation in vivo.
He also investigated an opportunity to suppress the light scattering in human skin and other biological tissues by applying various osmotically active agents, thus, pioneering the enhancement of probing depth for confocal reflectance microscopy and Optical Coherence Tomography (OCT). This approach, known as ‘optical clearing’, has since gained widespread use
Based on the collation with the procedure of iteration solution of Bethe-Salpeter equation Professor Meglinski generalised Monte Carlo method for simulation of coherent effects of multiple scattering. He introduced a new concept for the development of unified computational Monte Carlo model for simulation of coherent effects of multiple scattering of light. Based on this concept, utilising a parallel computational framework, known as NVIDIA Compute Unified Device Architecture (CUDA), accelerated with the Graphics Processing Units (GPU) and cloud-based environment solutions, the first Monte Carlo-based online computational toolbox for the needs of Biophotonics has been created. The developed approach is able not just simulate, but allowed to imitate the light propagation within tissue-like scattering medium mimicking the results observed in actual experiments. Up to date over 7500 users – PhD students and young researchers from around the world extensively use this toolbox  monthly.

Prof. Meglinski pioneered the application of circularly polarised light for cancer detection. He demonstrated that the phase shift of polarised light backscattered from samples of biological tissue carries important information about the presence of cervical intraepithelial neoplasia, whereas circularly polarised light is able to distinguish the successive grades of cancer.
He pioneered the study of vector laser beams propagation in turbid tissue-like scattering medium.
He made significant contributions in many branches in Life Science and Biophotonic: designed and developed sensors for monitoring stress conditions experienced by aquatic organisms influenced with water pollution and climate change,; introduced application of optical tweezers for characterisation mutual interaction of red blood cells influenced by nanoparticles and by pulsed laser radiation; developed sensing techniques for food quality control, and many other.

His current research interests are at the interface between modern physics, optics, and imaging modalities, focusing on the exploration of novel photonics-based phenomena and their implementation to practical applications in medicine, biology, life sciences and health care industries. Current research interests include application of coherent polarised light for cancer diagnosis, functional imaging of blood and lymph flows, neuroimaging and brain malformation studies; exploring human visual perception of polarised light and helical wave fronts; fundamentals of shaped light with orbital angular momentum and quantum entanglements transfer in turbid tissue-like scattering medium, screening of cell, cell’s organelles and cells interaction.

Publications
Professor Meglinski authored and co-authored of more than 400 scientific papers, and presented over 800 presentations at the major international conferences in the field, including over 200 keynote and plenary talks and invited lectures.

Honours, awards and professional recognition
Professor Meglinski's research earned his a number of awards and professional recognition:

 2022 Fellow of OPTICA (formerly Optical Society of America (OSA)))
 2021 APEX Award, (The Royal Society)
 2014 Fellow of The International Society for Optics and Photonic (SPIE)
 2012 Fellow of Institute of Physics (IoP)
 2012 Senior Member of Institute of Electrical and Electronics Engineers (IEEE)

Books

See also
Biophotonics
Orbital angular momentum of light

References

Fellows of Optica (society)
Fellows of SPIE
Fellows of the Institute of Physics
Senior Members of the IEEE
Optical physicists
Biomedical engineers
University of Pennsylvania alumni
Saratov State University alumni
1968 births
Living people
20th-century Russian physicists